"Candidatus Caballeronia rigidae" is a bacterium from the genus Caballeronia and the family Burkholderiaceae. Candidatus Burkholderia rigidae is an endosymbiont.

References

Burkholderiaceae
Bacteria described in 2012
Candidatus taxa